The 690th Cyberspace Operations Group, at Lackland Air Force Base, Texas, is a United States Air Force group operating the Cyber Security and Control System weapon system.  The group was established 1 April 1991 as the 6900 Communications-Computer Group.  The group was redesignated the Air Intelligence Agency Intelligence Systems Group on 1 October 1993. It was redesignated again as the 690th Information Operations Group on 1 Oct 1997.  On 5 July 2006, the group was again re-designated as the 690th Network Support Group.

The group is responsible for operating and maintaining the Air Force's global enterprise network.  690th COG was moved under the 688th Cyberspace Wing in 2018.

Component units

The group is composed of six squadrons and two detachments located around the world.

83d Network Operations Squadron

561st Network Operations Squadron

690th Cyberspace Operations Squadron

690th Intelligence Support Squadron

690th Network Support Squadron

691st Cyberspace Operations Squadron

Mission
Operate, sustain and defend the Air Force information network by employing the Cyberspace Security and Control System weapon system to assure global cyber supremacy, enforce network standards and develop Airmen as cyber warriors.

Lineage
 Established 1 April 1991 as the 6900th Communications-Computer Group
 Redesignated Air Intelligence Agency Intelligence Systems Group on 1 October 1993
 Redesignated 690th Information Operations Group on 1 October 1997
 Redesignated 690th Network Support Group on 5 July 2006

Components
 83rd Network Operations Squadron, August 2009 – present
 Langley Air Force Base, Virginia
 561st Network Operations Squadron ("Gryphons"), August 2009 – present
 Peterson Air Force Base, Colorado
 690th Computer Systems Squadron (later 690th Network Support Squadron), 1 October 1997 – present
 690th Information Operations Squadron, 1 October 1997 – 1 August 2000
 690th Intelligence Support Squadron, 1 October 1997 – present
 690th Cyberspace Operations Squadron, 8 January 2015 – present
 Hickam Air Force Base, Hawaii
 691st Cyberspace Operations Squadron, 4 March 2016 – present
 Ramstein Air Base, Germany

Assignments
 Electronic Security Command (later Air Force Intelligence Command, Air Intelligence Agency), 1 April 1991
 Eighth Air Force, 1 February 2001
 67th Information Operations Wing (later 67 Network Warfare Wing), 5 Nov 2001 – present

See also
 List of cyber warfare forces

References

External links 
 Twenty-Fourth Air Force (AFSPC) fact sheet
 

Communications groups of the United States Air Force
Information operations units and formations